William Candidus (23 July 1840 in Philadelphia – April 1910 in Frankfurt am Main) was an American opera singer.

Biography
In 1861 he sang first bass in several Philadelphia musical societies. During the American Civil War, he served three years in the 2nd Pennsylvania Heavy Artillery and elsewhere, being advanced to the grade of major. During his military service his voice gradually changed from first bass to tenor. After his return from the war, he accepted the position of tone regulator in the piano factory of Steinway & Sons, in New York City. He became a member of the Arion and Liederkranz societies, but soon went abroad and studied for the operatic stage under Konapazeck (Konaptczek) of Berlin, making his début in Weimar as Stradella. Subsequently, he studied under Rouchetti (Stefano Ronchetti-Monteviti), of Milan, and in 1880 became a member of the opera at Frankfort am Main, where he remained until the autumn of 1885, when he joined the American Opera Company.

Notes

References

1840 births
1910 deaths
19th-century American male opera singers
American tenors
Union Army officers
19th-century American male actors
American male stage actors
Musicians from Philadelphia
People of Pennsylvania in the American Civil War
Classical musicians from Pennsylvania
American expatriates in Germany